Cuch is a surname. Notable people with the surname include:
Christian Cuch (1943–2014), French cyclist
Tadeusz Cuch (born 1945), Polish sprinter

Polish-language surnames
French-language surnames